Yaël Boon  is a French–Swiss actress, director, film producer and screenwriter. Boon has appeared in several notable French language films including Welcome to the Sticks (2008) and Supercondriaque (2014). She has also worked on the production side of film; in 2010, she was a writer for Nothing to Declare and in 2016 produced Ma famille t'adore déjà.

Personal life 
She is multilingual and speaks five languages: French, English, German, Spanish, and Hebrew.

In 2003, she married French comedian Dany Boon, who converted to Judaism (her faith). The couple has three kids: Eytan, Elia, and Sarah. They separated in 2018.

Filmography

Film

Television

References

External links 
 

Year of birth missing (living people)
Living people
French actresses
French film producers